is a 1985 Japanese film directed by Shinji Sōmai.

Cast
 Yuichi Mikami as Kyoichi Mikami
 Youki Kudoh as Rie Takami
 Tomokazu Miura as Teacher Umemiya
 Yuka Onishi as  Michiko Omachi
 Yuriko Fuchizaki as Midori Morisaki
 Shingo Tsurumi
 Tomiko Ishii as Katsue Yagisawa

Awards and nominations
7th Yokohama Film Festival 
Won: Best Director - Shinji Sōmai
Won: Best Supporting Actor - Tomokazu Miura
2nd Best Film
1st Tokyo International Film Festival
Won: Tokyo Sakura Grand Prix
10th Hochi Film Award 
Won: Best Supporting Actor - Tomokazu Miura

See also
 List of Japanese films of 1985

References

External links
 

1985 films
Films directed by Shinji Sōmai
1980s Japanese-language films
Lesbian-related films
Japanese LGBT-related films
1980s Japanese films
1985 LGBT-related films
Japanese romantic drama films
LGBT-related romantic drama films